North West Twin Island is an island in the Kimberley (Western Australia) .

See also

List of islands of Western Australia

References

Islands of the Kimberley (Western Australia)